House at 251 Rocklyn Avenue is a historic home located at Lynbrook in Nassau County, New York. It is an L-shaped dwelling with 2-story central section, a 2-story addition to the east, and -story addition to the west with a 1-story rear addition and cross gable roof.  The oldest section, the west section, was built about 1793.  A single-story, partially enclosed porch extends across the center section.

It was listed on the National Register of Historic Places in 2008.

References

Houses on the National Register of Historic Places in New York (state)
Colonial Revival architecture in New York (state)
Houses completed in the 18th century
Houses in Nassau County, New York
National Register of Historic Places in Nassau County, New York